Neelathamara is a 2009 Indian Malayalam-language romantic drama film written by M. T. Vasudevan Nair and directed by Lal Jose. It is the remake of the 1979 film of the same name, scripted by M.T. himself and directed by Yusuf Ali Kechery. The film was produced by Suresh Kumar under the banner of Revathy Kalamandhir. It stars Kailash and newcomers, Archana Kavi & Amala Paul in the lead roles. The film received good reviews and was a box-office hit.

Plot
Beena, a program producer with NDTV 24x7, is in her ancestral village for a television program. She wants her fiancé Anand to meet her grandmother, who has just been discharged from the hospital. Beena, the daughter of K.P. Haridas, who died a few years back, is not in good terms with her mother Ratnam over her second marriage. Ratnam happens to visit the house at the same time. There she meets Kunjimalu, a middle-age lady who was once a housemaid in her teenage days. Kuttimalu is welcomed by grandmother with the same warmth that she enjoyed long back, and she says that her daughters are now well settled and are leading a happy lives. Ratnam is also affectionate towards Kunjimalu, who had once had an affair with Haridas.

In the night, while arranging the old books of Haridas, Ratnam comes across the snaps of Kunjimalu, which he had taken in his college days. She hands them over to Kunjimalu, which takes her back to the old days. The story switches to the late 1970s, when Kunjimalu had arrived as a maid with Appukuttan, her cousin and her grandmother. Kunjimalu succeeds in winning the heart of Haridas's mother in no time. She was an innocent village girl who always found fun in sharing secrets with Ammini, a girl of her age.

Ammini informs her about the myth of Neelathamara (blue lotus). According to believers, if they offer a one rupee note at the temple pond and prays deeply to the god, the flower will blossom the next morning and his/her wish will turn into truth. The arrival of Haridas, a final-year law student, adds more color to her life. He succeeds in alluring Kunjimalu in a short span, and they start to have a romantic and physical relationship. Kunjimalu believes that Haridas really loves her but she fails to understand that it was just fun that Haridas is looking for. Her prayer at the river pond results in blossoming of Neelathamara, which takes her to cloud nine. But news of the engagement of Haridas to Ratnam comes in as a shock, which breaks her down mentally. She slowly realizes that Haridas was never serious in his affair with her and tries to overcome the grief by silently serving Ratnam, his new wife. Ratnam one day learns of the affair and, when asked, Haridas replies casually, which makes her go berserk. Ratnam orders Kunjimalu to leave the house' she accepts silently. She is taken home by Appukuttan, whom she married.

Years later, Haridas is no more and both ladies have matured. The film ends with Kunjimalu once again with full heart preparing to take care of the octogenarian mother of Haridas.

Cast
 Archana Kavi as Kunjimalu (Old Film - Ambika)
 Kailash as Haridas (Old Film - Ravi Kumar)
 Samvrutha Sunil as Rathnam (Old Film - Bhavani)
 Amala Paul as Beena
 Tony Kattukaran as Anand
 Rima Kallingal as Shaarathe Ammini (Old Film - Jayaragini)
 Sreedevi Unni as Maluamma (Old Film - Santha Devi)
 Suresh Nair as Appukuttan (Old Film - Sathar)
 Joy Mathai as  Achuthan Nair (Old Film - Bahadoor)
 Jaya Menon as Elder Rethnam 
 Parvathi T. as Elder Kunjimalu
 Mullanezhi as the old man sitting under the banyan tree

Production
Neelathamara, though was announced as a remake of the old film with the same name, had several changes. While the old film was a love story between Kunjimalu and Haridas, the remake focused more on the contemporary lives of both Ratnam and Kunjimalu. M. T. Vasudevan Nair himself re-worked on the script.
This film had mostly newcomers, which was more like an experiment by Lal Jose.
The camera work by Vijay Ulaganath was well appreciated.
The performance of Archana Kavi also received positive remarks from both critics and masses.
This was actress Amala Paul's first film. Her next release was her debut as Anaka in Tamil; the critically acclaimed and box office hit Tamil film Mynaa.
The main villain role was played by Suresh Nair, the younger brother of Ambika, which was originally portrayed by Sathar.
 Noted Malayalam Poet and Lyricist Mullanezhi played a small role, as an old man sitting under the banyan tree near the temple.

Soundtrack

This film features a successful soundtrack composed by Vidyasagar with lyrics penned by Vayalar Sarath Chandra Varma. Vijay Prakash, famous through recent A. R. Rahman songs, was introduced to Malayalam through this film. The track "Anuraga Vilochananayi", sung by Shreya Ghoshal and V.Shreekumar (Shreekumar Vakkiyil), turned out to be one of the most successful songs of the year. It was the chart topper for many continuous weeks.

Vidyasagar won the Filmfare Award for Best Music Director and Mathrubhumi-Amrita Film Award for Best Music Director, for his work in the film. The track "Anuraga Vilochananayi" won the Most Popular Song of the Year Award at 2009 Vanitha Film Awards.

Box office
The film was commercial success.

References

General
 Neelathaamara (1979) - IMDB
 The Re-Birth of Neelathaamara
 M .T. and Lal Jose to redo 'Neela Thaamara
 Lal Jose remakes Neela Thamara
 Neelathamara Music Review

Specific

External links
 

2009 films
2000s Malayalam-language films
Remakes of Indian films
Indian romantic drama films
2009 romantic drama films
Films with screenplays by M. T. Vasudevan Nair
Films scored by Vidyasagar
Films directed by Lal Jose
Films shot in Thrissur